The Great Muppet Caper is a 1981 musical heist comedy film directed by Jim Henson (in his feature directorial debut). It is the second theatrical film in The Muppets franchise. In addition to the Muppet performers, the film stars Charles Grodin and Diana Rigg with special appearances by John Cleese, Robert Morley, Peter Ustinov, and Jack Warden. The film was produced by ITC Entertainment and The Jim Henson Company and distributed by Universal Pictures. In the plot, the Muppets are caught up in a jewel heist while investigating a robbery in London.

The film was released by Universal Pictures and Associated Film Distribution on 26 June 1981 in the United States and on 30 July 1981 in the United Kingdom. It is the only Muppets feature film directed by Henson. Shot in the United Kingdom and London in 1980, the film was released shortly after the final season of The Muppet Show.

Plot
Kermit the Frog and Fozzie Bear are investigative reporters for the Daily Chronicle newspaper—they are supposedly identical twins, which becomes the source of a running gag: nobody can tell they are twins unless Fozzie is wearing his hat. Gonzo the Great is their loyal photographer, and together they make a team. One day, after the trio is dismissed for failing to report on a major jewel robbery, Kermit asks their editor Mr. Tarkanian to allow them to travel to London to investigate the robbery and interview the victim, the prominent fashion designer Lady Holiday. Statler and Waldorf make appearances throughout the film to heckle them and the audience.

With only $12 for the trip, they are forced to travel in an airplane baggage hold and are literally thrown out of the plane as it passes over Britain. They stay at the dilapidated (but free) Happiness Hotel, which is populated by other Muppet characters, including Dr. Teeth and the Electric Mayhem, Scooter, the Swedish Chef, Dr. Bunsen Honeydew, Beaker, Lew Zealand, Rowlf the Dog, Sam the Eagle, Pops, Beauregard, Crazy Harry, Camilla the Chicken, and Rizzo the Rat. The next morning, when Kermit seeks out Lady Holiday in her office, he finds her newly hired receptionist, the alluring Miss Piggy, and mistakes her for the fashion designer. Piggy instantly falls in love with the little green reporter. She poses as Lady Holiday, and Kermit asks her out for dinner; to keep up the pose, she allows Kermit to assume she lives at a "highbrow" address. She sneaks into a townhouse at 17 Highbrow Street to wait for him (much to the surprise of the actual upper-class British residents), and they go out to the Dubonnet Club for dinner.

At the nightclub, the real Lady Holiday's necklace is stolen by her jealous brother Nicky and his accomplices Carla, Marla, and Darla, three of her exploited fashion models (the very same thieves who robbed her before). After the robbery, Miss Piggy's charade is revealed and she flees, leaving Kermit behind. The next day; in a London park, they reconcile after having a brief argument. Despite Nicky's instant attraction to Miss Piggy, he and his accomplices frame her for the necklace theft during Lady Holiday's fashion show. They plan to steal an even more valuable prize: Lady Holiday's largest and most valuable jewel, the Fabulous Baseball Diamond, now on display at the Mallory Gallery. Unbeknownst to them, Gonzo overhears their plot. He, Kermit, Fozzie, and the other residents of the Happiness Hotel decide to intercept the thieves and catch them red-handed to exonerate Miss Piggy. Kermit arrives at the prison to explain the plan to Piggy, while being disguised as her "lawyer".

The Muppets sneak into the Mallory Gallery and get to the Baseball Diamond at the same time as the thieves. They try to keep the diamond out of the thieves' hands via a game of keep away, but Nicky eventually catches the diamond and takes Kermit hostage at gunpoint. In the meantime, Piggy escapes from prison, and she races to the gallery, thus crashing through the window on a motorcycle that serendipitously fell off a truck in front of her. She knocks Nicky out and dispatches Carla, Marla and Darla with a flurry of furious karate chops. As the police arrive, all charges against Piggy are dropped, Nicky and his accomplices are arrested, and the Muppets get their deserved credit for foiling the heist.

The Muppets then return to the United States the same way they departed, thus being thrown out of the cargo hold and parachuting back.

Cast

Muppet performers

 Jim Henson as Kermit the Frog, Rowlf, Dr. Teeth, Waldorf, Swedish Chef and The Muppet Newsman
 Frank Oz as Miss Piggy, Fozzie Bear, Animal and Sam the Eagle
 Dave Goelz as The Great Gonzo, Beauregard, Zoot and Dr. Bunsen Honeydew
 Jerry Nelson as Floyd, Pops, Lew Zealand and Louis Kazagger. 
 Richard Hunt as Scooter, Statler, Sweetums, Janice and Beaker
 Steve Whitmire as Rizzo the Rat and Lips
 Louise Gold as Annie Sue
 Kathryn Mullen as Gaffer the Cat
 Caroll Spinney as Oscar the Grouch

Additional Muppets performed by Bob Payne, Robert Barnett, Brian Muehl, Hugh Spight, Mike Quinn and Brian Henson.

The main Muppeteers make onscreen cameo appearances: Jim Henson cameos as himself at the Dubonnet Club; Frank Oz can be seen in the newspaper office when Gonzo yells "Stop the presses!"; Richard Hunt plays a cab driver; and Jerry Nelson appears with his daughter Christine as human onlookers during the Muppet bicycle ride scene. (Christine Nelson - who plays the girl who mistakes Kermit for a bear - died at the age of 21 from cystic fibrosis in September 1982, a little over a year after the release of The Great Muppet Caper.)

Humans
 Diana Rigg as Lady Holiday, a famous British fashion designer who has been the victim of a jewel heist
 Charles Grodin as Nicky Holiday, Lady Holiday's brother
 Michael Robbins as Henderson, the Mallory Gallery's security guard
 Joan Sanderson as Dorcas, Neville's wife
 Peter Hughes as Stanley, a maître d' at the Dubonnet Club
 Peggy Aitchison as a prison guard
 Tommy Godfrey as a bus conductor
 Erica Creer as Marla, Nicky's henchwoman.
 Kate Howard as Carla, Nicky's henchwoman.
 Della Finch as Darla, Nicky's henchwoman.

Co-screenwriter Jay Tarses appears onscreen as the Air Steward who throws Kermit, Fozzie, and Gonzo out of the plane.

Cameo Guest Stars
 John Cleese as Neville, a rich British homeowner
 Robert Morley as a British gentleman
 Peter Ustinov as a truck driver, who has his truck stolen by Miss Piggy
 Jack Warden as Mike Tarkanian, the editor-in-chief of The Daily Chronicle
 Peter Falk makes an uncredited cameo as the man who talks to Kermit on the park bench.

Release
The Great Muppet Caper was theatrically released on 26 June 1981 in the United States and on 30 July 1981 in the United Kingdom. In celebration of the film's 40th anniversary, The Great Muppet Caper was re-released into theaters for two days on August 8 and 11, 2021.

Home media
The film was first released on Betamax, VHS, and LaserDisc in 1982 by 20th Century-Fox Video. On 29 January 1993, Buena Vista Home Video, under the Jim Henson Video label, re-released the film on VHS and LaserDisc.

It was reissued on VHS and released on DVD for the first time by Columbia Tristar Home Video and Jim Henson Home Entertainment on 1 June 1999. It was later released on DVD by Columbia Tristar Home Entertainment and Jim Henson Home Entertainment on 10 July 2001 and subsequently on 29 November 2005 by Walt Disney Home Entertainment as Kermit's 50th Anniversary Edition.

Walt Disney Studios Home Entertainment released The Great Muppet Caper on Blu-ray and DVD, alongside Muppet Treasure Island, on 10 December 2013.

Reception

Box office
After the success of The Muppet Movie (1979), and with good reviews, the film was expected to be a hit but grossed only half the amount of its predecessor. The film ultimately earned $31.2 million in the United States. The New York Times reported that one studio president had thought the use of the word "caper" in the title was a mistake.

It is the fifth-highest grossing Muppet film behind The Muppets (2011), The Muppet Movie (1979), Muppets Most Wanted (2014) and Muppet Treasure Island (1996).

Critical response
Roger Ebert of the Chicago Sun-Times gave the film a two star rating (out of four), writing "...Henson and his associates haven't developed a screenplay that pays attention to the Muppet personalities. Instead, they ship them to England and dump them into a basic caper plot, treating them every bit as much like a formula as James Bond." He concluded his review by stating that "the lack of a cutting edge hurts this movie. It's too nice, too routine, too predictable, and too safe." Similarly, Sheila Benson of the Los Angeles Times felt the "Muppets don't belong in a caper movie. They are interpreters of character, relationship and the human condition. (Of the first film's writers, Jerry Juhl and Jack Burns, only Juhl remains, now collaborating with Jack Rose; Tom Patchett and Jay Tarses are the other pair of writers credited. You can frequently scent trouble, or at least a lack of cohesion, as the list of writers mounts.) Somebody let the air out of the jokes and the originality out of the melodies, which this time are by Joe Raposo."

Gene Siskel of the Chicago Tribune awarded the film three out of four stars, particularly singling out Miss Piggy for her "fabulous personality, a genuine star quality". However, he felt the film suffers "from a case of the we-know-we're-cute-so-we-can-get-by-with-anything disease. The disease manifests itself in the script that forever interrupts itself with jokes about the movie we're watching ... I expect the screenwriters to try to write a seamless story. Anybody can interrupt the action of a movie for gratuitous remarks such as these, but it's a very cheap laugh." Todd McCarthy, reviewing for Variety, wrote that The Great Muppet Caper "possesses all the charm of the first installment", in which he applauded Henson for showing "a sure hand in guiding his appealing stars through their paces." Vincent Canby of The New York Times compared the romantic chemistry between Kermit the Frog and Miss Piggy to that of Nelson Eddy and Jeanette MacDonald, in which he praised both characters as the "real stars" of the film.

The film holds a 75% approval rating based on 24 reviews on Rotten Tomatoes, with an average score of 6.5/10. The site's consensus says "The Great Muppet Caper is overplotted and uneven, but the appealing presence of Kermit, Miss Piggy and the gang ensure that this heist flick is always breezily watchable." On Metacritic, it has a score of 70 out of 100, indicating "generally favorable reviews".

After the May 2021 death of co-star Charles Grodin, a number of writers called attention to his performance in the film. Robert Taylor of Collider wrote, "It's tough for a human actor to leave much of an impression in a Muppet movie. Their screen time is usually limited (often to just a cameo) and tends to consist of playing second banana to the Jim Henson-birthed lunacy. But in The Great Muppet Caper, Grodin employs his considerable comedy chops to more than hold his own, and he feels like a natural fit with the Muppet mayhem going on around him." Matthew Dessem wrote in Slate that "Hollywood is going to continue making movies, they say, and birds will continue to sing, and spring will continue to be lovely, and jewel thieves will continue to fall head over heels for pigs who are working as receptionists at posh British houses of fashion while attempting to launch their modeling careers. But a light has been extinguished, a greatness has gone out of the world, and it's fair to wonder if any other actor will ever embody pure, untamed desire for Miss Piggy the way Charles Grodin did. He was sensational."

Music
The songs and score for the film were written and composed by Joe Raposo. In 1982, Raposo was nominated for an Academy Award for Best Original Song for "The First Time It Happens" but lost to "Arthur's Theme (Best That You Can Do)" by Burt Bacharach, Carole Bayer Sager, Christopher Cross and Peter Allen from Arthur.

In 1981, Miss Piggy won the Youth in Film Award for Best Young Musical Recording Artist for her performance of "The First Time It Happens", becoming the first, and only, non-human recipient in the history of the award.

Soundtrack

The Great Muppet Caper: The Original Soundtrack contains all of the songs from the film, as well as several portions of dialogue and background score. The album reached #66 on Billboard's Top LP's and Tapes chart in 1981.

 Track listing

Notes

References

Bibliography

External links

 
 
 
 
 

1980s musical comedy films
1980s comedy mystery films
1981 comedy films
1981 directorial debut films
1981 films
1980s English-language films
American crime comedy films
American musical comedy films
American comedy mystery films
American heist films
American independent films
British crime comedy films
British musical comedy films
British comedy mystery films
British heist films
British independent films
Films directed by Jim Henson
Films scored by Joe Raposo
Films set in hotels
Films set in London
Films shot at EMI-Elstree Studios
Films shot in London
Films with screenplays by Jerry Juhl
ITC Entertainment films
Self-reflexive films
The Jim Henson Company films
The Muppets films
Universal Pictures films
Walt Disney Pictures films
1980s American films
1980s British films